Paula García Ávila (born 24 March 1992) is a Spanish handballer for Costa del Sol Malaga and the Spanish national team.

International honours   
EHF Challenge Cup:
Winner: 2015, Winner: 2021

References 

Living people
1992 births
Spanish female handball players
Sportspeople from Almuñécar
Expatriate handball players
Spanish expatriate sportspeople in France
Spanish expatriate sportspeople in Romania
Competitors at the 2018 Mediterranean Games
Mediterranean Games gold medalists for Spain
Mediterranean Games medalists in handball